Fold was the debut album by Australian rock band Epicure, which was issued on 7 August 2000. It was co-produced by the band with Cameron McKenzie for Flugelhorn Records/MGM Distribution.

Track listing 

 All music composed by Epicure, lyrics written by Juan Alban.
 "Calm"
 "Feet from Under Me"
 "Johnny Venus"
 "Son Shine"
 "Bottom of a Well"
 "Lights Out!"
 "Fly the Flag"
 "Opportunity's Knocking"
 "Sunsilk Girl"
 "On Hold"
 "Joy Committee"
 "Last Dance"

Singles

 "Feet from Under Me"

Personnel 

Epicure
 Juan Alban – vocals, guitar
 Tim Bignell – bass guitar
 Michael "Brownie" Brown – guitar
 Luke Cairnes – guitar
 Dom Santamaria – drums

Production and artwork
Produced – Cameron McKenzie and Epicure. Recorded at Texan Mansion Studio, St. Andrew's Studio, Black Beach Studio.
Artwork – Tim Bignell

References

2000 debut albums
Epicure (band) albums